Maisa Heloísa Juana Rojas Corradi (born 10 August 1972) is a Chilean politician, physicist and climatologist who has been serving as Minister for the Environment since 2022.

Early life and education
Rojas received her undergraduate degree in physics from the University of Chile and her Ph.D. in atmospheric physics from Lincoln College, Oxford.

Career

Career in academia
Rojas then was a postdoctoral fellow at International Research Institute for Climate and Society at Columbia University in 2001. She then returned to  Universidad de Chile as a postdoctoral fellow, researcher, and then professor of geophysics. 

During that time, Rojas became an international leading climate change scientist. She was the lead author of the Paleoclimate chapter for the UN Intergovernmental Panel on Climate Change's (IPCC) fifth report (AR5), and was also a coordinating lead author for the IPCC report (AR6). She has served on various presidential councils and committees on climate change.

Career in government
In 2022, Chilean President Gabriel Boric named Rojas to be Minister for the Environment in his cabinet.

Rojas, along with Jennifer Morgan, led the working group at the 2022 United Nations Climate Change Conference that came up with an agreement on loss and damage finance.

References

External links
 

1972 births
Living people
21st-century Chilean politicians
Alumni of the University of Oxford
Chilean climatologists
Chilean people of Italian descent
Environment ministers of Chile
Geophysicists
Paleoclimatologists
University of Chile alumni
Women government ministers of Chile